James Hunter Whiteside (April 15, 1924 – April 7, 2019) was an American politician in the state of Washington. He served the 14th district from 1975 to 1981.

References

1924 births
2019 deaths
Politicians from Yakima, Washington
Republican Party members of the Washington House of Representatives